Ravit Helled Ita (born in 1980) is an Israeli planetary scientist and a professor in the department of astrophysics and cosmology at the University of Zürich. 
She studies gas giant planets in the Solar System and exoplanets.

She is a member of the science team of Juno, a NASA probe to study the planet Jupiter. In 2015, she accurately calculated Saturn's rotational period together with Eli Galanti and Yohai Kaspi of the Weizmann Institute of Science. In 2015, selected among the 50 most influential women of Forbes Israel.

Biography 
Ravit Helled completed her bachelor's degree in science at Tel Aviv University in 2004. She continued her doctoral studies at Tel Aviv University, where she completed her PhD work on giant planet formation in 2007.

From 2007 to 2009 she was a postdoctoral fellow at the University of California Los Angeles in the Department of Planetary Science. In 2009, she was appointed a research fellow. During her time at the University of California, she studied the influence of planetesimals on the formation of gas giants, and modelled the outer planets in the Solar System.

In 2011 she was appointed Senior Lecturer in the Department of Earth Sciences of Tel Aviv University. In 2015, she was appointed Associate Professor in the Department of Earth Sciences.
In 2016 became a professor at the Institute for Computational Science at the University of Zurich. She is a member of the UZH Space Hub.

Helled is part of the scientific team of the NASA Juno probe, which is investigating the planet Jupiter.

She is also one of the lead scientists of the European Space Agency's JUICE Jupiter Icy Moon Explorer to Jupiter and also a member of the science team of the European Space Agency's Space Telescope PLATO (spacecraft) which is scheduled to be launched in 2026.

Research

Planetary formation
Helled's research deals with the formation and evolution of planets in the Solar System and beyond. Her studies examine the relationship between the formation of the planets and their internal structure, for the gas giants Jupiter and Saturn, and the ice giants Neptune and Uranus. 
The processes that lead to the formation of planets in the Solar System are compared to the formation of exoplanets. She also examines whether a uniform mechanism can be found predicting the formation of the planets, and the differences between different planetary systems and the physical processes that influence the formation of planets in a particular system.

Internal structure of planets and time of internal rotation 
Helled's research group also examines the internal structure of the planets and their composition. In the study, computational models are developed to predict the dynamic behaviour of the planet and compare it with existing observations. In the study, the team is investigating the velocities of the gas giants' internal-rotation and whether the structure can be related to the atmospheric movement of these planets.

Calculating the rotation periods of Saturn, Uranus and Neptune 
In 2010, Helled and collaborators suggested that the rotation periods of both Uranus and Neptune are in fact unknown. They suggested that the length of day on the ice giants are ~16.58 hr (Uranus) and 17.46 (Neptune). 
In 2015, Helled and collaborators accurately calculated Saturn's rotation time (10 hours, 32 minutes, 45 seconds). The previous calculation was based on measurements of the Voyager 2 probe in 1981. However, calculations from the Cassini probe showed that there is a discrepancy in numbers and there is a gap in the understanding and calculating of the Saturn's rotation time. The problem is that the components of Saturn's atmosphere, especially hydrogen and helium, travel at different speeds and do not attest to Saturn's own rotation. Therefore, Helled's research was based on calculating the speed of rotation by measuring Saturn's gravitational field and calculating its density and oblateness (the fact that its polar diameter is smaller than its equatorial diameter).

Obstacles to the movement of winds in Uranus and Neptune 
Together with Yohai Kaspi and Oded Aaronson of the Weizmann Institute of Science, Adam Schumann, and Bill Hubbard of the University of Arizona, Helled succeeded in calculating that the strong winds blowing over Neptune and Uranus are limited to an atmosphere layer whose depth is not more than 1,000 km.
In Neptune, these winds blow at speeds of about 2,000 km/h, with storms and strong jet currents. Since the discovery of these winds by the Voyager 2 probe, researchers have been trying to find out the extent of the phenomenon of wind, in order to better understand the composition of these ice giants. The team modelled the influence of the winds on the gravitational field of the planets and to show that the jet currents constitute only a small percentage of the planet's mass. The movement of the winds changes the momentary mass of the planet and thus a fluctuation in its gravitational field. By calculating the relationship between the pressure and density for the wind pattern and measuring the torque, they proved that the wind layer is limited to 1,000 km and constitutes only a few percent of the planet's mass. The researchers were able to create a map of the gravitational field of the planets based on wind data.

Selected publications 
 Ravit Helled, John D Anderson, Gerald Schubert, Morris Podolak. Interior Models of Uranus and Neptune. The Astrophysical Journal. 726 (1), 15 (9 December 2010) DOI: 10.1088/0004-637X/726/1/15
Ravit Helled et al. Giant Planet Formation, Evolution, and Internal Structure. Protostars and Planets VI. Henrik Beuther, Ralf S. Klessen, Cornelis P. Dullemond, and Thomas Henning (eds.), University of Arizona Press, Tucson, 914 pp., p. 643-665, DOI: 10.2458/azu_uapress_9780816531240-ch028, arXiv:1311.1142
 Ravit Helled, Gerald Schubert. Core Formation in Giant Gaseous Protoplanets. Astrophysics. DOI: 10.1016/j.icarus.2008.08.002, arXiv:0808.2787 [astro-ph]
Ravit Helled, Eli Galanti, Yohai Kaspi. Saturn's fast spin determined from its gravitational field and oblateness. Nature 520, 202–204 (9 April 2015); DOI: 10.1038/nature14278
Ravit Helled, Jonathan Lunine, Measuring Jupiter's water abundance by Juno: The link between interior and formation models. Monthly Notices of the Royal Astronomical Society. 03/2014; 441(3). DOI: 10.1093/mnras/stu516

Awards and recognition 
 Selected among the 50 most influential women of Forbes Israel (2015)
 Selected among the 50 influential women of Globes (2016)
 Selected in the list of the 40 most promising young people of the year by Globes (2016)
 The Mako site selected her as one of its most influential people in Israel (2016)

References

External links 
 Ravit Helled's homepage at Tel Aviv University 
 Ravit Helled's homepage at the University of Zurich 
 List of Publications by Ravit Helled 
 Elad Bazret, Israeli stars of Jupiter, the site "Yedioth Ahronoth", 6 July 2016
 Mickey Levy, Professor Ravit Helled Ita Israeli researcher of Mars, the site Globes

From her lectures
 Jupiter: Internal Structure, Formation, and Space Mission Juno, lecture at the Astronomy Club of Tel Aviv University, March 2013
 Ravit Helled, Giant Planet Formations, evolution and inner structure Lecture at Protostars and Planets VI, August 2013
 Ravit Helled (Tel-Aviv University) Alternative Formation Theory and Structure of Giant Planets, The Israel Institute for Advanced Study Channel, January 2016

Tel Aviv University alumni
Israeli scientists
Academic staff of the University of Zurich
Israeli astrophysicists
Women planetary scientists
21st-century women scientists
Planetary scientists
1980 births
Living people